Chishma (Şişmä) is a rural locality (a village) in Kuzeyevsky Selsoviet, Buzdyaksky District, Bashkortostan, Russia. The population was 134 as of 2010. There are 3 streets.

Geography 
Chishma is located 44 km north of Buzdyak (the district's administrative centre) by road. Pismyantamak is the nearest rural locality.

References 

Rural localities in Buzdyaksky District